Janet Turk Wittes is an American statistician known for her work on clinical trials.

Education
Wittes is the daughter of a chemist and a psychologist. She began her studies at Radcliffe College in the biochemistry program, choosing it over chemistry because of its added opportunities for mentorship. Her faculty mentor, John Tileston Edsall, noting her preference for  inference over experiment, guided her to aim for a career in statistics. Towards this goal, she switched her major to mathematics, graduating in 1964.

She stayed at Harvard University for her graduate studies in statistics.
At Harvard, she was supported by a fellowship from the United States Public Health Service (chosen because its application form was short) and because of this ended up working in biostatistics.
She completed her Ph.D. in 1970; her doctoral advisor was Theodore Colton.

Career
While her husband, physician Robert E. Wittes, served a term in the United States Public Health Service Commissioned Corps, Wittes did part-time postdoctoral research with Jerome Cornfield at the National Cancer Institute.
After an additional two years as a part-time instructor of epidemiology at Columbia University,
she became a regular-rank faculty member in the mathematics department at Hunter College in 1974 and remained there until 1982.

In 1983 she moved to the National Heart, Lung, and Blood Institute as chief of the Biostatistics Research Branch, and remained there until 1988,
when she left because of a change of employment by her husband,
and became a biostatistician for the Department of Veterans Affairs in Connecticut from 1989 to 1990.
Returning soon afterwards to Washington, and unable to find a suitable government position, she founded her consulting firm, Statistics Collaborative, in 1990.  she remains president of the firm.

Contributions and service
Wittes' research focuses on the design of clinical trials, and she has also published on mark and recapture methods.
With  Michael A. Proschan and K. K. Gordon Lan, she is an author of the book Statistical Monitoring of Clinical Trials: A Unified Approach (Springer, 2006).
 
Wittes was president of the Society for Clinical Trials for 2001. She was editor-in-chief of the society's journal Controlled Clinical Trials from 1994 to 1998.

Recognition
Wittes was elected as a Fellow of the American Statistical Association in 1989. She is also a Fellow of the American Association for the Advancement of Science and of the Society for Clinical Trials, and an elected member of the International Statistical Institute

She was the winner of the 2006 Janet L. Norwood Award For Outstanding Achievement By A Woman In The Statistical Sciences.
In 2015 the American Statistical Association gave her their W. J. Dixon Award for Excellence in Statistical Consulting "for exceptional contributions to advancing the science and art of statistical consulting and collaboration; for developing innovative, widely used, statistical methodology; for major worldwide accomplishments, especially in the area of clinical trials, including performing creative, easily interpretable interim analyses and serving on numerous data and safety monitoring boards; for extraordinary leadership as president of Statistics Collaborative; and for being a true beacon for integrity."

References

American statisticians
Women statisticians
Radcliffe College alumni
Columbia University faculty
Hunter College faculty
Elected Members of the International Statistical Institute
Fellows of the American Statistical Association
Fellows of the American Association for the Advancement of Science
Living people
Year of birth missing (living people)